Tyler-Jay Dibling (born 12 March 2006) is an English professional footballer who plays as a midfielder for Southampton.

Club career
Born in Exeter, Dibling started his career with local side Axminster Town AFC, where his father Sam played for the men's team. He joined Millwey Rise FC at the age of five, spending two years with the youth side. He joined Southampton in 2012, also spending a year with Exeter City at the age of seven, before signing a professional contract with The Saints in October 2021. In April 2022, he scored a hat-trick of near-identical goals in a Premier League 2 game against Newcastle United, with a video of the goals going viral.

Having been named on the bench for a Premier League game against Brentford, in which he did not feature, Dibling drew attention from Newcastle United and Chelsea. He joined the latter in July 2022, after ten years with Southampton, with the promise of a professional contract once he turned seventeen. However, after failing to settle at Chelsea, making only two appearances for the club's under-18 side, he returned to Southampton in September 2022. 

He signed a scholarship deal with Southampton on 17 September 2022, stating that the club felt like a "second home" to him. He is seen as one of the brightest prospects in Southampton's academy.

On 22 February 2023, Dibling signed his first professional contract, keeping him at Southampton until 2025.

International career
Dibling has represented England at under-16 and under-17 level.

Career statistics

Club

References

2006 births
Living people
Sportspeople from Exeter
English footballers
England youth international footballers
Association football midfielders
Exeter City F.C. players
Southampton F.C. players
Chelsea F.C. players